Bălești is a commune located in Vrancea County, Muntenia, Romania. It is composed of a single village, Bălești.

References

Communes in Vrancea County
Localities in Muntenia